Honestly is a studio album by American singer Lalah Hathaway, released on October 20, 2017. The album, produced entirely by Tiffany Gouche and Lalah Hathaway earned two Grammy Award nominations in 2019. "Y O Y" was nominated for Best R&B Performance and Honestly was nominated for Best R&B Album.

Release
A deluxe edition of the album was released digitally on June 27, 2018.

Reception
In a Vibe magazine interview, Desire Thompson described Honestly this way:

Even after making history, the singer would rather test the limits of her resounding vocals than float comfortably on one sound. While listening to cuts from her forthcoming album honestly, there's an electronic-bluesy presence, a stark difference from her 2015 project. There's also bold stances on love throughout tracks like "change ya life" and "what you need," paired with joyous cuts "i can't wait" and the revolutionary Lecrae-assisted jam, "don't give up."

Track listing

Note
 All track titles are stylized in lowercase.

References

2017 albums
Lalah Hathaway albums